Inara Luigas (born 13 January 1959) is an Estonian politician. She has been a member of the X Riigikogu, XI Riigikogu, XII Riigikogu and XIII Riigikogu.

She was born in Novosibirsk Oblast in Siberia. She is a member of Estonian Centre Party.

In 2002 she was named to Seto Kingdom's chief sootska.

References

1959 births
Living people
Estonian Centre Party politicians
Women members of the Riigikogu
Members of the Riigikogu, 2003–2007
Members of the Riigikogu, 2007–2011
Members of the Riigikogu, 2011–2015
Members of the Riigikogu, 2015–2019
Estonian University of Life Sciences alumni
21st-century Estonian women politicians